Thomas Albert George "Tony" James (16 September 1919 – 1981) was a Welsh professional footballer who scored 25 goals from 90 appearances in the English Football League playing for Brighton & Hove Albion and Bristol Rovers. He was Brighton's top scorer in the 1947–48 season with 14 goals in all competitions. He went on to play 41 times for Southern League club Bath City. James was born in Ynysybwl, Glamorgan, and played as an inside forward.

References

1919 births
1981 deaths
People from Ynysybwl
Sportspeople from Rhondda Cynon Taf
Welsh footballers
Association football forwards
Folkestone F.C. players
Brighton & Hove Albion F.C. players
Bristol Rovers F.C. players
Bath City F.C. players
English Football League players
Southern Football League players